Samuel Kuc (born 23 March 1998) is a Slovak professional footballer who plays as a centre-back.

Club career

FK Železiarne Podbrezová
Kuc made his professional debut for Železiarne Podbrezová against ViOn Zlaté Moravce on 23 September 2017.

Honours
Stal Rzeszów
II liga: 2021–22

References

External links
 FK Železiarne Podbrezová official club profile 
 
 Futbalnet profile 
 

1998 births
Living people
Slovak footballers
Association football defenders
FK Železiarne Podbrezová players
MFK Tatran Liptovský Mikuláš players
FC Košice (2018) players
Stal Rzeszów players
FK Humenné players
Slovak Super Liga players
2. Liga (Slovakia) players
II liga players
Slovak expatriate footballers
Expatriate footballers in Poland
Slovak expatriate sportspeople in Poland
Sportspeople from Košice